Glyphipterix amphipoda is a species of sedge moth in the genus Glyphipterix. It was described by Edward Meyrick in 1920.

References

Moths described in 1920
Glyphipterigidae